Imane Anys (Arabic: إِيمَان أَنِيس, born 14 May 1996), better known as  Pokimane ( or ), is a Moroccan-Canadian Twitch streamer and YouTuber. She is best known for her live streams on Twitch, broadcasting video game content, most notably in League of Legends and Fortnite. She is currently the most-followed female streamer on the platform. She is a member and co-founder of OfflineTV, an online social entertainment group of content creators.

Career

Twitch streaming 
Anys created her Twitch account in June 2013. She began streaming later that year with a $250 PC she bought off a classified website after she reached Platinum rank in League of Legends. The name Pokimane is a portmanteau of Pokémon and her name, Imane.

She gained 450,000 followers on Twitch in 2017, earning her account a place within the 100 most followed on the platform. As a result of her account's rise on the platform in 2017, the Shorty Awards named her as the Best Twitch Streamer of the year. The Shorty Awards detailed that her gameplay and commentary on the popular game League of Legends propelled her to popularity on Twitch. Anys had a cameo appearance in a League of Legends trailer announcing a new game mode.

Anys has been known to stream gameplay and commentary of Fortnite, which she first streamed as part of a sponsorship. At E3 in 2018, Epic Games, the developers of Fortnite, arranged a pro–am event. The event paired streamers with mainstream celebrities in a match of Fortnites Battle Royale mode; Anys was paired with rapper Desiigner but shortly before the event, he was replaced with basketball player Josh Hart. In mid-March 2019, Anys addressed her declining amount of Fortnite streams, stating that she needed to "think about what I like or dislike about the content that I've been making."

Tech news website Digital Trends detailed that Anys frequently interacts with her audience and described her "laidback but enthusiastic personality" as "perfectly suited to long-form streams." Aside from streaming gaming content, Anys also podcasts and streams miscellaneous real-world moments.

As one of the more popular streamers on the platform, Twitch has directly partnered with Anys. In July 2018, Twitch selected her as one of 15 ambassadors for the 2018 iteration of their TwitchCon event. Later that month, Twitch also scheduled Anys as a partner for their Twitch Creator Camp, a series of broadcasts and articles designed to help content creators build successful channels. In March 2020, Anys signed a multi-year exclusivity with Twitch. Social Blade listed Anys as the 9th most followed user on Twitch, with over 8.5 million followers as of 21 December 2021.

In late October 2020, Anys collaborated with U.S. representatives Alexandria Ocasio-Cortez and Ilhan Omar along with several other notable streamers including Disguised Toast and HasanAbi for a session of Among Us as part of a get-out-the-vote initiative for the 2020 United States presidential election.

Anys was named a featured honoree in the 2021 Forbes 30 Under 30 under the category of "Games", which noted her prominence as the largest female streamer on Twitch and as one of the founders of OfflineTV. She had 8.5 million followers on Twitch as of July 2021.

On 8 January 2022, Anys' Twitch account was suspended for 48 hours midway through an Avatar: The Last Airbender watch stream following a DMCA claim from ViacomCBS. Later in the month, Anys' stream was raided by viewers of JiDion. He was later banned, which received the attention of streamer Ninja, who stated he would use his connections to get the ban reversed. Anys criticized this response from Ninja, particularly calling out Ninja's use of the word bitches when speaking on the issue.

In February 2022, Anys re-signed with Twitch. In 2022, Pokimane ranked 7th among Canadian streamers in terms of the number of viewers.

YouTube 
In addition to streaming on the Twitch platform, Anys also has multiple YouTube channels: Pokimane, Pokimane Too, Pokimane VODS, Poki ASMR, and imane. The Pokimane channel features edited gaming clips from streams while Pokimane Too includes unrelated clips of her gaming content, vlogs, and podcast. On the Pokimane VODS channel, full unedited VOD clips of streams are uploaded. The Poki ASMR channel featured videos that are part of a broader YouTube community of ASMR content, though Anys has ceased uploading on the channel. In 2021, Anys launched a new channel entitled simply 'imane' which covers more personal topics and vlogs rather than gaming-related topics.

Anys is also a member of OfflineTV, a collaborative YouTube channel made up of content creators. Speaking about the channel, Anys stated, "it's not fun being a streamer and living alone, so we decided to come together in a way so we not only keep each other company but we can also collab and actually do good work and content for everyone else."

Other ventures 
In October 2019, it was announced that Anys, among a number of other internet personalities, would appear in the film Free Guy, directed by Shawn Levy, which was released in August 2021.

In June 2020, Anys joined Markiplier and Jacksepticeye's fashion brand Cloak as a partner and creative director.

Anys made a cameo appearance in the music video for Bella Poarch's song "Inferno", released in August 2021.

In October 2021, it was announced that Anys had helped launch a talent management and brand consulting firm called RTS, where she will serve as the Chief Creative Officer.

Personal life 
Anys was born in Morocco on 14 May 1996. Her family moved to Quebec, Canada, when she was four years old. Her parents were academics. Anys attended McMaster University and studied chemical engineering but dropped out later to pursue her streaming career full-time. She currently lives in Los Angeles.

Filmography

Film

Music videos

Awards and nominations

See also 
 List of most-followed Twitch channels
 OfflineTV

Notes

References

External links 
 

1996 births
21st-century Moroccan women
Canadian YouTubers
Gaming YouTubers
Let's Players
Living people
McMaster University alumni
Moroccan emigrants to Canada
Moroccan people
Practitioners of autonomous sensory meridian response
Shorty Award winners
Twitch (service) streamers
Video game commentators
Women video bloggers
YouTube vloggers
Streamer Award winners
YouTube channels launched in 2014